Flipswap Inc. was a company  headquartered in Torrance, California.

Flipswap acquired mobile phones in order to resell them or recycle them in an environmentally friendly manner through various free and eco-friendly services. Flipswap partners with a wide array of retailers, e-tailers, device manufacturers and websites. Flipswap offered trade-in services for instant store credit at more than 6,000 participating retail locations

In 2008, Flipswap raised $14M in series B funding from RRE Ventures and NGEN Partners 

In February 2011, AT&T began offering Flipswap services through all its corporate retail locations 

In 2012, FlipSwap was acquired by eRecyclingCorps.

References

External links 
 Flipswap

Mobile phone recycling
Recycling organizations
Telecommunications companies of the United States
Companies based in Los Angeles County, California
Reuse